The Rat Race Blues is an album by American saxophonist Gigi Gryce recorded in 1960 for the New Jazz label.

Reception

Harvey Pekar, writing in his four star review in the August 10, 1962 issue of Down Beat stated: "Gryce's major contributions to jazz have been made as an outstanding composer-arranger. But his writing ability notwithstanding... this is primarily a blowing session." AllMusic reviewer Scott Yanow awarded the album 4 stars stating "The group swings its way through two of Gryce's lesser-known originals and three then-recent obscurities. Interesting and generally fresh straight-ahead jazz."

Track listing
All compositions by Gigi Gryce except where noted
 "The Rat Race Blues" – 6:35   
 "Strange Feelin (Sam Finch) – 7:45   
 "Boxer's Blues" – 6:58   
 "Blues in Bloom" (Norman Mapp) – 7:44   
 "Monday Through Sunday" (Mapp) – 11:09

Personnel 
Gigi Gryce – alto saxophone 
Richard Williams – trumpet
Richard Wyands – piano
Julian Euell – bass
Mickey Roker – drums

References 

1960 albums
Gigi Gryce albums
New Jazz Records albums
Albums produced by Esmond Edwards
Albums recorded at Van Gelder Studio